The County of Bigorre was a small feudatory of the Duchy of Gascony in the ninth through 15th centuries. Its capital was Tarbes.

The county was constituted out of the dowry of Faquilène, an Aquitainian princess, for her husband Donatus Lupus I, the son of Lupus III of Gascony. The original Bigorre was considerable in size, but successive generations, following on Gascon traditions, gave out portions as appanages to younger sons. The county lost Lavedan, Aster, Aure, and Montaner in the first two generations.

The original dynasty died out in Bigorre in the 11th century, the county passing to the House of Foix and then that of Béarn. In the 12th century, it went to the house of Marsan and then of Comminges and in the thirteenth to that of Montfort. It was briefly in the hands of the Armagnacs and passed between English and French suzerainty during the Hundred Years' War before finally being recovered by the French. In the 15th century, it fell to the House of Foix again and thence to the crown in an exchange of properties.

List of counts of Bigorre

House of Montfort
1251 – 1256 Alice with her second husband
1251-1256 Raoul of Courtenay

House of Chabanais
1256 – 1283 Esquivat
1283 – 1302 Laura

After this point the succession became disputed and whether the county owes allegiance to England or France was also fought over. In 1360, the Treaty of Brétigny made it decisively French. In 1407, it belonged to Bernard VII of Armagnac, who sold it that year to John I, Count of Foix. From then on it is a subsidiary title of the counts of Foix.

 
 
Bigorre
Bigorre